Eustache Restout (12 November 1655, in Caen – 1 November 1743, in Mondaye) was a French architect, engraver, painter and Premonstratensian canon regular, belonging to the artistic Restout dynasty. At his death he was sub-prior of abbaye Saint-Martin de Mondaye - he had produced the plans on which that monastery was rebuilt and painted several paintings for it (now in Bayeux Cathedral). His students included his nephew Jean II Restout.

References

 Édouard Frère, Manuel du bibliographe normand, Rouen, Le Brument, 1860
 Philippe de Chennevières, Recherches sur la vie et les ouvrages de quelques peintres provinciaux de l'ancienne France, Paris, Dumoulin, 1847–1862

1655 births
1743 deaths
Clergy from Caen
17th-century French engravers
18th-century French engravers
17th-century French painters
18th-century French painters
17th-century French architects
18th-century French architects
French male painters
Premonstratensians
Artists from Caen
18th-century French male artists